Nancy E. Krulik (born in Brooklyn, New York) is the author of more than 200 books for children and young adults, including three New York Times bestsellers.

Books
Krulik is the author and creator of several book series, beginning with Katie Kazoo, Switcheroo in 2002.  The How I Survived Middle School series launched in June 2007.  In July 2008, Grosset and Dunlap (a division of Penguin Young Readers) launched the George Brown, Class Clown series, a spin-off of Katie Kazoo, with the book Super Burp.  Her mystery series for kids, Jack Gets a Clue launched in 2011. In 2013, she published the Magic Bone series, which follows the adventures of Sparky, a sheepdog puppy, who travels the world thanks to the magic he finds in a very special chew toy.  The first two books in the series: Be Careful What You Sniff For and Catch that Wave were published in May. Krulik followed that series with Project Droid, a science fiction series of six books written with her daughter Amanda Burwasser, The Kid From Planet Z (a young chapter book series about a family who crashes down on earth and must follow the instructions of their leader, a talking cat named Zeus), and Princess Pulverizer, a series about a princess who wants to be a knight and must go on a Quest of Kindness to prove that she is up to the task. Along the way Princess Pulverizer meets up with a dragon who uses his fire to make grilled cheese, and a timid knight-in-training who has been nicknamed Lucas the Lily-Livered.
Krulik introduced the Ms. Frogbottom's Field Trips Series in 2021.

She has also written a number of celebrity biographies for young readers, including a biography of Leonardo DiCaprio that made the New York Times bestseller list.

Personal life
Nancy Krulik graduated with a degree in journalism from Temple University in Philadelphia, and currently lives in Manhattan with her husband, composer Daniel Burwasser and their rescue Lhasa apso. Her daughter Amanda is a writer and teacher in Northern California, and her son, Ian is a musician and voice actor in Los Angeles.

Bibliography

Standalone

Katie Kazoo, Switcheroo series 
Source:
Anyone But Me
Out to Lunch
Oh, Baby!
Girls Don't Have Cooties
I Hate Rules!
Get Lost!
Drat! You Copycat!
Doggone It!
Any Way You Slice It
Quiet on the Set!
No Messin' with My Lesson
No Bones About It
On Your Mark, Get Set, Laugh!
Friends for Never
Love Stinks!
Bad Rap
Write On!
Karate Katie
Gotcha! Gotcha Back!
Be Nice to Mice
I'm Game!
It's Snow Joke
Open Wide
No Biz Like Show Biz
My Pops Is Tops!
Something's Fishy
Flower Power
Free the Worms!
Major League Mess-Up
Horsing Around
Tip-Top Tappin' Mom!
Going Batty
Red, White and-Achoo!
Hair Today, Gone Tomorrow
Three Cheers for...Who?

Katie Kazoo specials
Who's Afraid of Fourth Grade?
A Whirlwind Vacation
A Katie Kazoo Christmas
Witch Switch
Camp Rules!
On Thin Ice
Holly's Jolly Christmas!
Don't Be Such a Turkey!

How I Survived Middle School series
Can You Get an F in Lunch?
Madame President
I Heard a Rumor
The New Girl
Cheat Sheet
P.S. I Really Like You
Who's Got Spirit?
It's All Downhill from Here
Caught in the Web
Into the Woods
Wish Upon a Star
I Thought We Were Friends!

How I Survived Middle School specials
How the Pops Stole Christmas

The Great Mathemachicken Series

 Hide and Go Beak
 Anyway You Slice It

George Brown, Class Clown series

Jack Gets a Clue series

Magic Bone series

Project Droid series 
Project Droid was co-written with Amanda Burwasser

The Kid from Planet Z series

Princess Pulverizer series

Ms. Frogbottom's Field Trips Series

Disney novelizations

Disney Chapters

Picture books

References

External links
 "All about Nancy Krulik", Katie Kazoo official website
 

Year of birth missing (living people)
Living people
21st-century American novelists
American women novelists
American writers of young adult literature
People from Brooklyn
Women writers of young adult literature
21st-century American women writers
Novelists from New York (state)
Temple University alumni